General Alton Davis Slay, Sr. (November 11, 1924 – November 16, 2015) was a four star United States Air Force general and former commander, Air Force Systems Command, Andrews Air Force Base, Maryland.

Slay was a native of Crystal Springs, Mississippi. He was a command pilot with more than 8,000 flying hours, principally in single-engine and jet fighter aircraft, accumulated since his graduation from flying school at Craig Field, Alabama, in 1944. He flew 181 combat missions over Southeast Asia in jet fighters. He was a graduate of the Navy Parachutist School and wore the Senior Air Force Parachutist Badge and the Senior Missileman Badge.

Slay was a 1965 graduate of George Washington University at Washington, D.C., with a degree in mathematics; he attended the six-week Harvard Business School Advanced Management Program; and the Canadian National Defence College.

His assignments included deputy chief of staff, research and development, Headquarters U.S. Air Force, Washington, D.C., vice commander of the Air Training Command, San Antonio, Texas; commander of the Lowry Technical Training Command, Denver; deputy chief of staff, operations, Seventh Air Force, in Southeast Asia; director of operations, Military Assistance Command, Vietnam; deputy chief of staff, operations, Air Force Systems Command; commander of the Air Force Flight Test Center, Edwards Air Force Base, California; and assistant deputy chief of staff, plans and operations, U.S. Air Forces in Europe. He assumed command of Systems Command in March 1978, and was promoted to four star rank on April 1, 1978. Slay retired from the Air Force on January 31, 1981.

Awards and decorations

In 2005, Slay won four gold medals at the National Senior Games in cycling. As of 2007, at age 83, he was still competing in the Senior Games cycling events. He resided in Warrenton, Virginia until he died of blood cancer on November 16, 2015, 5 days after his 91st birthday.

References

1924 births
2015 deaths
People from Crystal Springs, Mississippi
United States Air Force generals
United States Air Force personnel of the Vietnam War
Columbian College of Arts and Sciences alumni
Recipients of the Order of the Sword (United States)
People from Warrenton, Virginia
Recipients of the Distinguished Service Order (Vietnam)